Frances Vane may refer to:
 Frances Vane, Marchioness of Londonderry, English heiress and noblewoman
 Frances Vane, Viscountess Vane, British memoirist